Wulingshan Bridge is a  high cable-stayed bridge at Pengshui, Chongqing, China. , it is among the forty highest bridges in the world.

See also
List of highest bridges in the world
List of tallest bridges in the world

External links
http://www.highestbridges.com/wiki/index.php?title=Wulingshan_Bridge

References

Cable-stayed bridges in China
Bridges in Chongqing
Bridges completed in 2009